Andrew D. Gordon is a British computer scientist employed by Microsoft Research. His research interests include programming language design, formal methods, concurrency, cryptography, and access control.

Biography
Gordon earned a Ph.D. from the University of Cambridge in 1992. Until 1997 Gordon was a Research Fellow at the University of Cambridge Computer Laboratory. He then joined the Microsoft Research laboratory in Cambridge, England, where he is a principal researcher in the Programming Principles and Tools group. He also holds a professorship at the University of Edinburgh.

Research
Gordon is one of the designers of Concurrent Haskell, a functional programming language with explicit primitives for concurrency. He is the co-designer with Martin Abadi of spi calculus, an extension of the π-calculus for formalized reasoning about cryptographic systems. He and Luca Cardelli invented the ambient calculus for reasoning about mobile code. With Moritz Y. Becker and Cédric Fournet, Gordon also designed SecPAL, a Microsoft specification language for access control policies.

Awards and honours
Gordon's Ph.D. thesis, Functional Programming and Input/Output, won the 1993 Distinguished Dissertation Award of the British Computer Society. His 2000 paper on the ambient calculus subject with Luca Cardelli, "Anytime, Anywhere: Modal Logics for Mobile Ambients", won the 2010 SIGPLAN Most Influential POPL Paper Award.

References

External links
 Home page at Microsoft Research
 

Year of birth missing (living people)
Living people
British computer scientists
Formal methods people
Members of the University of Cambridge Computer Laboratory
Academics of the University of Edinburgh
Programming language researchers